Saint-Félicien may refer to: 

Places:
 Saint-Félicien, Ardèche
 Saint-Félicien, Quebec

Food:
 Saint-Félicien cheese